Frédéric Zitter (born 28 October 1979) is a French professional rugby league footballer who played for Catalans Dragons in the Super League competition. He has also represented the French national team, scoring a try against Australia in 2004.

Zitter signed for Catalans Dragons from the Barrow Raiders, making one Super League appearance during the 2006 season.

References

1979 births
Living people
Barrow Raiders players
Catalans Dragons players
Featherstone Rovers players
France national rugby league team players
French rugby league players
Limoux Grizzlies players
Rugby league wingers